Philippe Pélissier (born 30 November 1947) is a French figure skating coach and former competitor. Competing in men's singles, he won six medals at the French Figure Skating Championships. He competed at the 1964 Winter Olympics, placing 23rd, and at the 1968 Winter Olympics, placing 13th. As a coach, he has trained many elite skaters, including Thierry Cerez, Didier Gailhaguet, Jean-Christophe Simond, Stanick Jeannette and Alban Préaubert. Pélissier is known for his expressive reactions behind the boards when his skaters are competing.

He also skated pairs with Micheline Joubert, winning the French national title three times.

Results

Men's singles

Pairs with Joubert

References

 Skatabase: 1960s Olympics

1947 births
Living people
French male single skaters
French male pair skaters
Olympic figure skaters of France
Figure skaters at the 1964 Winter Olympics
Figure skaters at the 1968 Winter Olympics
French figure skating coaches
Universiade medalists in figure skating
Universiade bronze medalists for France
Medalists at the 1966 Winter Universiade